Sean Newton Haugh (born November 17, 1960) is an American politician and pizza delivery man who has run for Senate in North Carolina under the Libertarian Party nomination in 2002, 2014 and 2016. He currently resides in Durham, North Carolina.

Campaigns

2002 
During his 2002 campaign Haugh also acted as Executive Director of the Libertarian Party of North Carolina. Haugh helped raise money for Libertarian candidates by helping sell calendars featuring pinups of female Libertarians which were made by fellow Libertarian Rachel Mills, an idea thought up during an informal conversation between Haugh and Mills about fundraising. The calendars were sold for $20 each with Haugh describing all the photographs as "tasteful" and saying the calendar received mostly positive reactions.

2014 
Although Haugh had sworn off of politics years earlier he decided to run in 2014 because he couldn't stand the idea of only having a Democrat and a Republican on the ballot. Haugh became well known for his campaign video where he shares his political platform. These videos are filmed from his campaign manager's basement.

During Haugh's 2014 campaign the conservative group American Future Fund funded an online campaign for Haugh. The ads for the campaign used slogans like "Get Haugh, Get High" and "More Weed, Less War". Though the ads directly supported Haugh the candidate himself has stated

Haugh told the Charlotte Observer that "Apparently all three campaigns are now busy telling everyone that I am the best candidate in this race."

2016 
Haugh was not invited to the debate between Deborah Ross and Richard Burr for the 2016 election. He tweeted that instead he would be delivering pizzas during the debate.

Elections

Personal life 
Haugh has lived in Durham, North Carolina since 1988. He is married to Pam Adams and owns two dogs and two cats. His hobbies include cooking, reading, listening to music, and football. He is not affiliated with any religion. In August 2016 Haugh had a heart-attack and was admitted to Duke University Hospital.

References 

1960 births
21st-century American politicians
American cannabis activists
North Carolina Libertarians
Living people
Politicians from Durham, North Carolina
Politicians from Tucson, Arizona